Milagros Alicia Moy Alvarado (born October 17, 1975) is a volleyball player from Peru, who twice represented her native country at the Summer Olympics: 1996 and 2000. She plays as a wing-spiker.

Career
Moy won with the Peruvian club Cristal Bancoper the silver medal in the 1995 South American Club Championship played in Medellin, Colombia.

She played for the German team "Rote Raben Vilsbiburg" for the 2008/09 season.

For the 2009/2010 season, she played with Valeriano Alles Menorca Volei in the Spanish Superliga Femenina de Voleibol.

Moy returned to play in the Peruvian League, signing with the Universidad César Vallejo club. She won the league championship with the club in that season and was awarded Most Valuable Player. She then played the South American Club Championship and her club lost to Brazilian Unilever, winning the silver medal and the Best Server individual award.

Clubs
 Cristal Bancoper (1995)
 Preca Brummel Cislago (1996–1997)
 Benidorm (2001–2003)
 Albacete (2003–2006)
 Gran Canaria Hotel Cantur (2006–2008)
 Rote Raben (2008–2009)
 Valeriano Alles Menorca Volei (2009–2010)
 Castellana Grotte (2010–2011)
 Esse-ti La Nef Loreto (2011-2012)
 Universidad César Vallejo (2012-2015)
 Regatas Lima (2015-2016)

Awards

Individuals
 2013 Liga Nacional Superior de Voleibol Femenino "Best Server"
 2013 Liga Nacional Superior de Voleibol Femenino "Best Most Valuable Player"
 2013 South American Club Championship "Best Server"

Senior Team
 2005 Bolivarian Games,  Gold Medal

Clubs
 1995 South American Club Championship -  Runner-Up, with Cristal Bancoper
 2009 German Cup -  Champion, with Rote Raben
 2012 Coppa Italia A2 -  Champion, with Esse-ti La Nef Loreto
 2012–13 Peruvian League-  Champion, with Universidad César Vallejo
 2013 South American Club Championship -  Runner-Up, with Universidad César Vallejo

References

External links
 FIVB Profile
 Italian League Profile

1975 births
Living people
Olympic volleyball players of Peru
Volleyball players at the 1996 Summer Olympics
Volleyball players at the 2000 Summer Olympics
Sportspeople from Lima
Peruvian women's volleyball players
Peruvian expatriate sportspeople in Spain
Peruvian expatriate sportspeople in Germany
Expatriate volleyball players in Spain
Expatriate volleyball players in Germany
21st-century Peruvian women